Hell River, also known as Partisans and The Last Guerilla, is a 1974 Yugoslav partisan film starring Rod Taylor as a Yugoslav raised in America who returns home to fight the Germans as a Partisan in World War II. Adam West plays a German officer.

The film was shot on location in Yugoslavia, and claims to be based on a true story.  There are several versions, including an original three-hour cut made for Yugoslavian television, and a feature-length version for the American market. Rod Taylor was involved in rewriting and shooting some additional scenes during post production.

Cast
Rod Taylor as Marko
Adam West as Capt. Kurt Kohler
Brioni Farrell as Anna Kleitz
Bata Živojinović as Brka
Peter Carsten as Col. Henke
Olivera Katarina as Mila
Branko Pleša as Brig. Gen. Steiger
Marinko Šebez as Sele
Janez Vrhovec as Col. Hoffmann
Dragomir Felba as Chicha
Gizela Vuković as Woman Mayor
Cane Firaunović as Lt. Schuler
Jovan Janićijević as Machek
Dragomir Čumić as Partisan (uncredited)
Dragomir Stanojevic as German (uncredited)
Zoran Stojiljković as German Officer (uncredited)
Predrag Milinković as Jewish Refugee (uncredited)

Notes
The producer, Ika Panajotovic, was a lawyer and former tennis player who represented Yugoslavia in the Davis Cup and reached the semi-finals at Wimbledon.

Footage from Hell River was used in Once Upon a Time in Hollywood, reedited to feature Leonardo DiCaprio.

References

External links

Hell River at the Rod Taylor Site

Yugoslav war films
English-language Yugoslav films
Partisan films
1974 films
Macaroni Combat films
Yugoslav World War II films
Films about anti-fascism
Films about Yugoslav Resistance
War films set in Partisan Yugoslavia
World War II films based on actual events
1970s English-language films
1970s Italian films